Aleksandr Nebogov (born 3 March 1949) is a Soviet equestrian. He competed in two events at the 1972 Summer Olympics.

References

1949 births
Living people
Soviet male equestrians
Olympic equestrians of the Soviet Union
Equestrians at the 1972 Summer Olympics
Place of birth missing (living people)